Khanekuk (also Romanized as Khanekūk; also known as Khanehkūk and Khāneh-ye Kūk) is a village in, and the capital of, Howmeh Rural District of the Central District of Ferdows County, South Khorasan province, Iran. At the 2006 National Census, its population was 926 in 259 households. The following census in 2011 counted 1,018 people in 314 households. The latest census in 2016 showed a population of 1,099 people in 341 households; it was the largest village in its rural district.

References 

Ferdows County

Populated places in South Khorasan Province

Populated places in Ferdows County